Phaegoptera medionigra is a moth of the family Erebidae. It was described by Reich in 1934. It is found in Brazil.

References

Phaegoptera
Moths described in 1934